de la Hoz is a common surname in the Spanish language, meaning of the sickle.

Marianela De La Hoz (born 1956), Mexican painter
Mike de la Hoz (born 1938), Cuban baseball player
Nicolas De la Hoz (born 1960), Colombian artist
Juan Claudio de la Hoz y Mota (1630?-1710?), Spanish dramatist
 Deivy De La Hoz y Anita De la Hoz  2006-2014 Miami- Fl